The Midlander was a passenger train that operated in Queensland, Australia between 1954 and 1993. It travelled on the Central west line between Rockhampton and Winton.

History
Victorian Railways introduced air-conditioned trains in 1935, and Queensland decided to follow suit in the late 1940s. New features included showers in the sleeping cars, roomettes in first class and head end power cars, especially necessary where trains may be delayed by floods or other events, as was often the case.

The Midlander was introduced in 1954, replacing the Mail train with its wooden carriages and providing a more comfortable and cleaner service.

Completing its initial run from Brisbane to Rockhampton, The Midlander arrived in Rockhampton at 4pm on 4 May 1954. The Midlander then commenced its maiden voyage, departing from the Rockhampton railway station for Winton at 5:25pm.   About 100 people watched from the platform as the train made its departure.  Most of the available accommodation on the train was booked out for the first journey. Among the passengers on the train's first run to Winton were Minister for Transport Jack Duggan, Minister for Education George Devries and Member for Mackenzie Paddy Whyte.

The train arrived in Longreach at 1:15pm the following day, before arriving in Winton several hours later.   Large crowds gathered at both Longreach and Winton to welcome the train where brief ceremonies took place.

Through many years of its service, a diesel electric locomotive would pull the train to Emerald, before switching to two steam locomotives which would then pull the train through the Drummond Range.  One of the steam locomotives would be taken off at Jericho, with the train continuing to Winton with just one steam locomotive.

Within a decade of its maiden journey, The Midlander'''s most infamous incident, the Medway Creek rail disaster occurred near Bogantungan during its return journey to Rockhampton on 26 February 1960 where seven people were killed when the flood-damaged bridge above Medway Creek collapsed, forcing the train to plunge into the water below.(26 February 2016) Medway Disaster, Central Queensland News. Retrieved 13 December 2019.

Replacement
In the late 1980s, tourism to western Queensland began to grow following attractions such as the Stockman's Hall of Fame opening at Longreach. To cater for this market, and recognising the fact that travellers dislike changing trains, The Midlander was combined with the Brisbane - Rockhampton Capricornian Train renamed the Spirit of the Outback'' in November 1993 and the new service commenced at Brisbane and terminated at Longreach. A bus service now provides the connection to Winton.

See also

Rail transport in Queensland

References

External links
Queensland Rail - Spirit of the Outback

Named passenger trains of Queensland
Railway services introduced in 1954
1954 establishments in Australia
1993 disestablishments in Australia
Railway services discontinued in 1993
Discontinued railway services in Australia